Kaliszkowice  is a settlement in the administrative district of Gmina Skąpe, within Świebodzin County, Lubusz Voivodeship, in western Poland.

The settlement has a population of 11.

References

Kaliszkowice